Elvis Antoine is a Mauritian footballer who played as left back at the Fire Brigade SC in the 1980s. He scored in the penalty shootout to give the victory to the Mauritian team in the Indian Ocean Games final in 1985. He was then transferred to Sunrise Flacq United, where he reached the first round of African Cup of Champions Clubs in 1988.

He pursued his career in football as a coach, from 2000 to 2003 with the Faucon Flacq where he won the Republic Cup in 2003. He then became co-coach of the national team with Rajesh Gunesh in December 2003 until March 2005.

References

Mauritian football managers
Mauritian footballers
Mauritius national football team managers
Living people
Association football fullbacks
Year of birth missing (living people)